The 27th New Brunswick Legislative Assembly represented New Brunswick between March 13, 1890, and September 28, 1892.

Samuel Leonard Tilley served as Lieutenant-Governor of New Brunswick.

Albert S. White was chosen as speaker.

The Liberal Party led by Andrew G. Blair was able to form a government with the support of independent members.

The 27th New Brunswick Legislature abolished the upper house, the Legislative Council, on April 16, 1891. Donald Desserud and Stewart Hyson argued that "the impetus to rid the
province of its upper assembly seems to have been less a concern over the council’s elite status, and more because it cost money to operate. Nevertheless, the time it took to abolish the upper chamber tested the patience of New Brunswick’s premier, Andrew Blair (1883-1896), who complained that his appointees to the upper chamber -- chosen for their supposed willingness to support his reform agenda -- developed an alarming independence once they took their seats. Blair eventually got the vote he wanted; however, the council imposed a condition: the council would continue until the next election. So Blair requested and was granted a dissolution two years early, and 'An Act Relating to the Legislative
Council' formally abolished the chamber on 16 April 1891."

History

Members 

Notes:

References 
The Canadian parliamentary companion, 1891, JA Gemmill

Terms of the New Brunswick Legislature
1890 establishments in New Brunswick
1892 disestablishments in New Brunswick
19th century in New Brunswick